The 2011 Baltic States Swimming Championships  was held in Riga, Latvia, from March 12–13.

Medal table

Events 
Freestyle: 50 m, 100 m, 200 m, 400 m
Backstroke: 50 m, 100 m, 200 m
Breaststroke: 50 m, 100 m, 200 m
Butterfly: 50 m, 100 m, 200 m
Individual medley: 200 m, 400 m
Relay: 4×100 m free, 4×100 m medley

Results

Men's events

Women's events

See also
List of Baltic records in swimming

References

External links
Results

2011
2011 in Latvian sport
2011 in swimming
International sports competitions hosted by Latvia
Sports competitions in Riga
March 2011 sports events in Europe